The Benxi Water Caves is a partially submerged cavern system containing a forest of stalactites and stalagmites, located  east of Benxi, Liaoning Province, People's Republic of China.  It was made a national park on January 10, 1994, and is open to the public all year round.  It was designated an "AAAAA"-class tourist attraction by CNTA in 2015.

Currently  of the cave has been developed for tourism, with a dock  into the entrance and a  docking bay large enough to park 40 boats.

In addition to the water caves, the national park also offers tourist attractions such as trekking to the top of the mountain, Woodstone Kingdom, dinghy rafting on the Taizi River, and the geological museum which hosts many relics and rare specimens collected from the national park area.

References

External links

Official site in Chinese & English

National parks of China
Caves of Liaoning
Karst caves
Karst formations of China
Show caves in China
Protected areas established in 1994
Geology of Liaoning
Tourist attractions in Liaoning